1984 saw the 9th season in Saudi Arabian top-flight football. Al-Hilal won the title for the 3rd time and the first since 1979.

The league was also expanded to feature 12 teams, with no relegation from the season before.

Newly promoted sides Al Ohud and Al Jabalain went straight back down.

Stadia and locations

League table

Promoted: Al-Ta'ee, Al Kawkab.
Full records are not known at this time

Champions

External links 
 RSSSF Stats
 Saudi Arabia Football Federation
 Saudi League Statistics
 Article writer for Saleh Al-Hoireny - Al-Jazirah newspaper 03-09-2010

Saudi Premier League seasons
Professional League
Saudi Professional League